Abdallah Lamrani (1946 – 14 April 2019) was a Moroccan footballer who played as a defender. At club level, he played for FAR Rabat. He also played for the Morocco at international level, representing his country at the 1970 FIFA World Cup. Lamrani was a sergeant of the Moroccan Army.

References

External links
 

1946 births
2019 deaths
Moroccan footballers
Morocco international footballers
Association football defenders
AS FAR (football) players
Botola players
1970 FIFA World Cup players
1972 African Cup of Nations players
Footballers at the 1972 Summer Olympics
Olympic footballers of Morocco